BBC Gujarati is  an international news service by BBC in the Gujarati language. It was launched on 2 October 2017. The service is  being operated on websites and social networking sites. The launch is part of the World Service's biggest expansion since the 1940s, following a government funding boost announced in 2016.

According to the official website of BBC, Gujarati spoken by 50 million people, and hence it is the 26th most used language in the world.

See also 

BBC World Service
BBC Punjabi
BBC Urdu

References

External links 
 BBC Gujarati

British Indian mass media
British Pakistani mass media
Gujarati-language mass media
Gujarati
Radio stations established in 2017